Suruí (of Jiparaná), also known as Paíter or Suruí-Paíter, is a Tupian language of Brazil. The Suruí of Rondônia call themselves Paiter, which means “the true people, we ourselves". They speak a language of the Tupi group and Monde language family. There were 1,171 Suruí-Paíter in 2010.

Phonology

Vowels

Consonants 

 /β/ can be heard as either [β] or [w] in free variation, and as [ɸ] when before voiceless consonants.
 Sounds /p, t, k, m, n, ŋ/, can be heard as [p̚, t̚, k̚, m̚, n̚, ŋ̚] in word-final position.
 /b/ can be heard as prenasal [ᵐb] when after a nasal vowel, or when in initial position.
 /h/ can be heard as voiced [ɦ] when between vowels. It is also said to be heard as a voiceless lateral [l̥], among elder speakers.
 /j/ can be heard as nasal [j̃] when preceding or in between nasal vowels.

References

External links 
ELAR archive of Documentation of Gavião and Suruí Languages in whistled and instrumental speech by Julien Meyer
ELAR archive of Language Documentation of traditional culture among the Gavião and Suruí of Rondônia by Dennis Moore

Tupian languages

Mamoré–Guaporé linguistic area